Babinda is a rural town and locality in the Cairns Region, Queensland, Australia.

Geography

The town is noted for its proximity to Queensland's two highest mountains Mount Bartle Frere (Queensland's highest peak) and Mount Bellenden Ker.

Babinda and Tully annually compete for the Golden Gumboot, an award for Australia's wettest town. Babinda is usually the winner, recording an annual average rainfall of over  each year.

History
Babinda takes its name from the local Indigenous Australian language for mountain. Other sources, however, claim it is a Yidinji word for water, possibly referring to the high rainfall of the area.

Babinda State School opened on 4 November 1914.

Babinda Post Office opened by 1915 (a Babinda Creek receiving office had been open since 1891).

The Babinda Sugar Mill opened on 15 September 1915. It closed on 23 February 2011.

On 20 April 1916, the Cane Beetles March commenced at Mooliba (now Mirriwinni). It was a snowball march to recruit men into the Australian Imperial Force during World War I at a time when enthusiasm to enlist had waned after the loss of life in the Gallipoli campaign. The march began at Mooliba with 4 men, passing through Babinda, Aloomba, Gordonvale, and Edmonton, and ending in Cairns 60 kilometers later with 29 recruits.

Babinda Presbyterian church was officially opened on 5 November 1916 by Reverend S. Mitchell.

On Sunday 18 March 1917, Bishop John Heavey laid the foundation for Babinda's Catholic Church. Heavey returned on Sunday 15 July to dedicate the church.

On 10 March 1918, a cyclone badly damaged the town with some reports saying that no building was left standing. An entire train at the railway station was blown over. Both the Presbyterian and Catholic churches were "blown to pieces".

On Sunday 16 March 1919, the new Presbyterian Church was officially opened by the Reverend Fixter.

On Sunday 9 July 1922, Heavey officially opened and blessed the rebuilt Catholic church. 

The Babinda War Memorial was unveiled by the chairman of the Cairns Shire Council Seymour Warner on 25 April 1927.

The Babinda Parish of the Roman Catholic Apostolic Vicariate of Cooktown (now the Roman Catholic Diocese of Cairns) was established in 1934.

The Babinda Public Library building opened in 1955.

In March 2006, Babinda was struck by Cyclone Larry, damaging up to 80% of buildings.

Of these, 49.7% were male and 50.3% were female. The age distribution of Babinda residents was skewed slightly higher than the greater Australian population. 70.1% of residents were over 25 years in 2006, compared to the Australian average of 66.5%; and 29.9% were younger than 25 years, compared to the Australian average of 33.5%.

At the 2011 census, the town recorded a population of 1,068.

Heritage listings
Babinda has a number of heritage-listed sites, including:
 65-85 Munro Street: Babinda State Hotel
 109 Munro Street: Babinda Air Raid Shelter

Media
The local newspapers are The Cairns Post or the Wet Tropic Times.

Education
St Rita's School is a Catholic primary (Prep-6) school for boys and girls at 7-13 Church Street. In 2018, the school had an enrolment of 22 students with 7 teachers (5 full-time equivalent) and 6 non-teaching staff (3 full-time equivalent).

Babinda State School is a government primary and secondary (Prep-12) school for boys and girls at Boulders Road (corner of Pollard Road). In 2018, the school had an enrolment of 257 students with 30 teachers (27 full-time equivalent) and 22 non-teaching staff (13 full-time equivalent). It includes a special education program.

Babinda Kindergarten is on Church Street and Babinda Early Learning is on Pollard Road.

Amenities 

The Cairns Regional Council operates a public library in Babinda at 24 Munro Street.

The Babinda branch of the Queensland Country Women's Association meets at the QCWA Hall in School Road.

St Rita's Catholic Church is at 15 Church Street. It is within the Babinda Parish of the Roman Catholic Diocese of Cairns and is administered from Innisfail.

The Babinda Munro Picture Theatre operates Friday, Saturday and Sunday nights.

Events 
There are many different community events in Babinda. The annual Harvest Festival is celebrated in October and features some unusual events including the Sugar Bowl competition, the Gumboot Toss and the Umbrella Toss (reflecting Babinda's connection to the sugar industry and its wet weather). The festival has been running since the 1960s but did not occur in 2006 due to Cyclone Larry.

Attractions

The Boulders and Devil's Pool are popular tourist attractions. A picnic area is located nearby, beside Babinda Creek.

Babinda Rotary Park is on Howard Kennedy Drive. It provides free camping for up to 3 days.

Transportation
Babinda is situated on the Bruce Highway.  The town has a railway station for access to the long-distance train services, currently only the Spirit of Queensland for which an advance booking must be made for the train to stop in Babinda.

Climate
Babinda has a tropical rainforest climate (Af) with humid and persistently wet weather. It is well known and recognised as the wettest town in Australia, with an annual average rainfall of 4279.4 mm. Monthly totals over 1000 mm are not uncommon, and sometimes, usually between January and April, whole months will go by without a single sunny day.

The wet season lasts from December to May, while the 'dry season' occurs from June to November. During the wet season, heavy monsoonal downpours occur almost daily and occasionally even heavier rain from tropical lows or cyclones occurs. Rainfall still totals well over 100mm a month during the dry season; however, it is usually in the form of coastal showers, which can range from 1 or 2 millimeters, to brief downpours of 100mm or more. Thunderstorms with dangerous lightning and damaging winds can be a threat from October to December; however, this threat decreases when the monsoon begins to take over in January.

See also

 Suburbs of Cairns
 List of tramways in Queensland

References

External links

 
 
Watch historical footage of Babinda, Cairns and Far North Queensland from the National Film and Sound Archive of Australia's collection

Babinda Munro Theatre Sponsored by the Babinda pharmacy showing the latest films.

 
Populated places in Far North Queensland
Towns in Queensland
Suburbs of Cairns
Localities in Queensland